Tau Dil Ka Kia Hua ( So What Happened to the Heart) is a Pakistani television series aired  on 2 July 2017 on Hum TV replacing Sammi. It stars an ensemble cast including Zahid Ahmed, Sami Khan, Ayeza Khan, Mansha Pasha, Imran Ashraf and Hajra Yamin in leads. The series ended on 18 February 2018.

Written by Khalil-ur-Rehman Qamar, the serial is directed by Shahid Shafat. It is produced by Sana Shahnawaz, Samina Humayun Saeed and Tariq Shah in Next Level Productions.

Plot
Sarwat Chawala is married to Sanuaber and is having an affair with Ateeqa and has betrayed both women. He left Ateeqa when he discovers that she is pregnant. Sanauber got to know about this betrayal and she set fire to their house, burning herself. After Sanauber's death, Sarwat is extremely upset and commits suicide, but before dying, he asks his brother Siraj to take care of his one-year-old son Faris (Sanauber's son) as well as Ateeqa's child who was not born yet. He also requests Siraj to marry Ateeqa. Siraj, despite being in love with Zulekha, marries Ateeqa and respects his brother's last wish.  But Ateeqa tells Siraj to leave Faris as she does not want to raise him. Siraj did not want to abandon his one year old nephew.  Ateeqa, infuriated, leaves for South Africa and begins an affair with an Indian man. Ateeqa gives birth to a boy she names Saif and after his birth, Ateeqa gets divorced from Siraj and marries an Indian man and settles in South Africa. Saif lives a horrible childhood and he believes that he is Siraj's son (but the truth is that his father was Sarwat and Siraj is his uncle). He wants to ruin Siraj for leaving him so he comes to Pakistan and starts to spoil Faris' marriage by starting an affair with Faris’ wife Maya (Ayeza Khan). Saif knows that Siraj loves Faris a lot so he wants to hirt Faris in order to hurt Siraj. Maya asks Faris for a divorce which he gives, but Faris is deeply shattered. Saif does not actually love Maya. He is in love with his  mother's relative's daughter Lubna. In fact, Lubna and Saif have been engaged since childhood. When Maya discovers this, she is shattered and she once again falls in love with Faris and wants to get him back at any cost. But Faris has gotten over with her and is falling in love with Maya's younger sister Zoya.

Cast

 Ayeza Khan as Maya, Faris' ex-wife, Tipu's ex-wife, Naamdaar's elder daughter, Zoya's sister
 Sami Khan as Faris Chawala: Siraj's nephew, Saif's half-brother
 Zahid Ahmed as Saif Chawala and Sarwat Chawala (double role)
 Mansha Pasha as Dariya, Faris' childhood best friend
 Noor Khan as Zoya, Maya's younger sister
 Imran Ashraf as Tipu, Maya's second ex-husband
 Hajra Yamin as Lubna, Saif's fiancée
 Hira Hussain as Muzna
 Rehan Sheikh as Faris' uncle
 Usman Peerzada as Maya's father
 Behroze Sabzwari as Muzna's father
 Seemi Pasha as Muzna's mother
 Farah Shah as Maya's mother
 Hajra Khan as Maya and Lubna's friend and lawyer

References

External links 
 Official Website

Pakistani drama television series
Television series about actors
2017 Pakistani television series debuts
Urdu-language television shows
Hum TV original programming
2018 Pakistani television series endings